The 2010–11 Sussex County Football League season was the 86th in the history of Sussex County Football League a football competition in England.

Division One

Division One featured 18 clubs which competed in the division last season, along with two new clubs, promoted from Division Two:
Rye United
Sidley United

League table

Division Two

Division Two featured 16 clubs which competed in the division last season, along with two new clubs:
Bexhill United, promoted from Division Three
Mile Oak, relegated from Division One

Also, Wealden changed name to A.F.C. Uckfield.

League table

Division Three

Division Three featured 14 clubs which competed in the division last season, along with two new clubs:
Barnham, joined from the West Sussex League
Ferring, joined from the Worthing & District League

League table

References

2010-11
9